Tempel is a hamlet in the Dutch province of South Holland. It is a part of the former municipality of Reeuwijk, and lies about 6 km north of Gouda.

The statistical area "Tempel", which also can include the surrounding countryside, has a population of around 200.

References

Bodegraven-Reeuwijk
Populated places in South Holland